The women's field hockey tournament at the 2007 Australian Youth Olympic Festival was the first edition of the field hockey tournament for women at the AYOF.

Great Britain won the tournament for the first time by defeating Australia 4–2 in the final. New Zealand won the bronze medal by defeating China 3–1 in the third and fourth place playoff.

Teams

Results

Pool matches

Classification matches

Third and fourth place

Final

Statistics

Final standings

Goalscorers

References

External links

Field hockey at the Australian Youth Olympic Festival
International women's field hockey competitions hosted by Australia
2007 in women's field hockey
2007 in Australian women's field hockey
2007 in Australian field hockey
2007 Australian Youth Olympic Festival